Paussomorphus is a genus of beetles in the family Carabidae, containing the following species:

 Paussomorphus chevrolati (Westwood, 1852)
 Paussomorphus conradsianus (Reichensperger, 1938)
 Paussomorphus pauliani Reichensperger, 1951

References

Paussinae